= Abamon =

Abamon (Russian: Абамо́н) is an old and rare Russian male first name. The patronymics derived from this first name are "Абамо́нович" (Abamonovich; masculine) and "Абамо́новна" (Abamonovna; feminine).
